Niklaus-Samuel Gugger (born 1 May 1970, in Udupi, India) popularly known as Nick is a Swiss Indian descent politician. He is a member of the Swiss National Council elected from Evangelical People's Party (EPP) of Switzerland since 2017.

Early life and education 
Nick Gugger was born to the widow of Brahmin, Anasuya at the CSI Basel Mission Hospital in Udupi, Karnataka, India. Due to difficulties, his mother was unable to keep him and gave him to Dr Marianne Pflugfelder of the missionary hospital to help find a reliable adopter. A Swiss couple Fritz and Elizabeth adopted him and named him Niklaus-Samuel Gugger. He was raised in Thalassery, India for four years before his adopted family moved to Uetendorf, Switzerland where he was raised. Nick married in 1994 and named his first daughter after his mother Anasuya whom he praised as a “very powerful, compassionate and loving woman” that he never met.

Following completion of his academic studies, Nick enrolled for an apprenticeship as a mechanic in Steffisburg. He later went for an internship in social work in Colombia and became youth and social worker upon completion of the training.  Nick was awarded an honorary doctorate by the Kalinga Institute of Industrial Technology in Odisha, India for his social work for children and young people.

In the wake of the COVID-19 pandemic, Nik Gugger launched a fundraising campaign to enable ventilator purchases in Odisha, India.

Political career 
Nick is a member of Evangelical People's Party of Switzerland (EPP) and sits on the central board of the party. He was elected to the City Council of Winterthur in 2002 and became president of EPP group in the council in 2008. In the 2010 Winterthur election, he received absolute majority, placed eight position but fell short of being admitted to the seven-member committee. He was elected to the Zurich Cantonal Council from 2014 to 2017. He ran for government council in Zurich in 2015 but lost. In 2017, he was elected to the National Council and was re-elected in 2019. He serves on the Foreign Policy Committee, and he is a member of the Council of Europe and vice-president of the EPP Switzerland.

References 

Living people
1970 births
Evangelical People's Party of Switzerland politicians